The Federal State of the Visayas was a revolutionary state in the Philippine archipelago during the revolutionary period. It was a proposed administrative unit of a Philippines under a federal form of government.

History

Panay revolt
A revolutionary group, the Comité Conspirador (Conspirators Committee), was organized in the town of Molo in Panay island in March 1898. The group, which planned an uprising against the Spanish colonial government, regularly held meetings at the residence of Francisco Villanueva. The organization later became the Comité Central Revolucionario de Visayas (Central Revolutionary Committee of the Visayas) as support for the group grew. They commenced a revolution in Panay in August 1898 and established a temporary revolutionary government in November 1898, which would later be known as the Gobierno Provisional del Distrito de Visayas (Provisional Government of the District of Visayas). The rebels were led by Col. Adriano Hernandez.

The Spanish–American War which sparked in Cuba reached the Philippines. On May 1, 1898, US Commodore George Dewey defeated the Spanish Navy in Manila. The Spanish designated Iloilo City as the colonial government's capital after Manila fell to the Americans on August 13, 1898, and later installed Roque López as president of the provisional government in Santa Barbara town in Iloilo. Diego de los Ríos was named Governor General over the Philippines. The Spanish armed the Iloilo Voluntarios (Iloilo Volunteers), a battalion composed mainly of Ilonggos believing that they are loyal to the Spanish crown. However, Ilonggo revolutionaries, calling themselves the "Ejército Libertador" (Liberation Army), started a revolt gaining control of all of Panay within days, except for Iloilo, Jaro, La Paz and Molo.

Malolos Congress
The Panay government, along with the two cantonal governments and other governments in Leyte and Samar were represented in the Malolos Congress which ratified the declaration of Philippine Independence although they had reservations in regards to the Malolos-based government by President Emilio Aguinaldo. Within the month when the congress was convened, these governments recognized the authority of the Malolos Government but retained governance over its jurisdiction. The Visayas governments still had the ability to exercise taxation and maintain their own armies.

Provisional government
A convention was held at Santa Barbara town on November 17, 1898 which saw the establishment of a provisional revolutionary government with Roque Lopez elected as president. The Philippine flag was raised on a bamboo hoist at the Bermejo house at the town plaza.

At least two other governments were established in the Visayas; The Cantonal Government of Bohol in August 1898 and the Cantonal Government of Negros in November 1898.

Formation

Visayas-based leaders proposed that an independent Philippine nation be a federation. To promote this ideal, the Cantonal governments of Bohol and Negros, as well as the Provisional Government in the Visayas which exercised powers over Panay and Romblon formed the Federal State of the Visayas on December 2, 1898. The governance of the federal state was patterned after the United States federalism and the Swiss confederacy. The government was reportedly created following consultations with Emilio Aguinaldo. Roque Lopez who was the president of the provisional government in Panay became the federal state's president and Iloilo City was designated as the Visayas capital.

Visayas officials made the draft of the terms of surrender of Spanish Governor General Diego de los Rios in December 1898. De los Rios left Iloilo on December 24 and Vicente Gay was installed as mayor of Iloilo City. The city was turned over to the Visayas government. A triumphal parade to Iloilo City was made on Christmas Day which ended in the hoisting of the Philippine flag in Plaza Alfonso XII (now Plaza Libertad) in front of the city hall.

A junta was appointed by the Federal State of Visayas and officials expressed the need to establish a federal republican state over Luzon, Visayas, and Mindanao and maintained allegiance to Aguinaldo. Elections were planned as soon as peace was established.

Dissolution
The dissolution of the federal state is disputed by various sources. The federal state was abolished by Central government in Malolos by Emilio Aguinaldo on April 27, 1899. Historian Gregorio Zaide says that Jovito Yusay, the last president of the federal state, dissolved the Visayas government on September 23, 1899 by decree. The instigation of the Consejo de Luzon, a Tagalog faction, was the cause of the state's demise at an undetermined date according to the Philippine Revolutionary Records. General Martin Delgado agreed to form a politico-military government after discussing with local military leaders without seeking consent from the civilian federal government on September 21, 1899 and dissolved the federal state on October 5, 1899 by issuing a decree citing Aguinaldo's earlier decree. A politico-military government was installed in Iloilo with Martin Delgado as governor.

The Negros Republic, a component state, later became an American protectorate before it was absorbed into a U.S. administered Philippines.

Government

See also
Federalism in the Philippines

References

Further reading
 

Former countries in Philippine history
Former federations
Philippine–American War
Philippine Revolution
States and territories disestablished in 1899
States and territories established in 1898